Jianghan District (Yangtze and Han River) forms part of the urban core of and is one of 13 urban districts of the prefecture-level city of Wuhan, the capital of Hubei Province, China. The district is part of the historical Hankou.

Geography
Jianghan District is situated on the northwest (left) bank of the Yangtze River. It is both the least spacious and most densely populated of the districts of Wuhan. It borders Dongxihu to the north, Jiang'an to the northeast, Hanyang to the south, and Qiaokou to the west; on the opposite bank it borders Wuchang. Wuhan Center is located in Jianghan District.

Administrative divisions
Jianghan District administers:

References

 
County-level divisions of Hubei
Geography of Wuhan